The Second Jungbu Expressway is an expressway in South Korea, connecting Icheon to Hanam.  Numbered 37, it runs parallel to and directly alongside the Jungbu Expressway (35) between Majang (Hangul:마장) and Sangok (Hangul:산곡), though it does not have any exits or junctions along its length.  (It is possible, however, to transfer between the two expressways (35 and 37) at Icheon Services (rest area).

Compositions

Lanes 
 All segments of 2nd Jungbu Expressway : 4

Length 
 31.08 km

Limited Speed 
 110 km/h & Low 60 km/h

List of facilities

IC: Interchange, JC: Junction, SA: Service Area, TG:Tollgate

See also
 Roads and expressways in South Korea
 Transportation in South Korea

External links
 MOCT South Korean Government Transport Department

Expressways in South Korea
Roads in Gyeonggi

ja:中部高速道路